Sunway Velocity Mall is a shopping mall in Cheras, Kuala Lumpur, Malaysia owned by Sunway Group.

History
The shopping mall was originally planned to be opened in October 2016. However, it was delayed and finally opened on 8 December that year.

Tenants
The shopping mall houses 500 retail shops, anchor tenants, cinema, fitness center and department store.

Precincts

Market Place – located at the Basement 1
Food Street Food – located at Level 4 Centre Court
Commune – located at Level 5 near the Cinema

Architecture
The shopping mall is a 9-story building with a total floor area of 92,000 m2. The building is connected to the adjacent Sunway Velocity Hotel. It has a gross development value of MYR1.6 billion.

Transportation
The shopping center is accessible via two rapid transit stations.  Maluri station is connected to Sunway Velocity Mall's Level 1 &  Cochrane MRT station is connected to Sunway Velocity by a 198-metre bridge from Entrance B of the station. Besides Maluri Station of Ampang Line, LRT and Kajang line MRT is just a walking distance away from the shopping mall.

There are 6500 parking bays in its basement parking lot (Sunway Velocity parking rate).

References

External links

 

2016 establishments in Malaysia
Shopping malls in Kuala Lumpur
Sunway Group